The following list is a discography of production by Ryan Leslie.

Singles produced

2003

Various artists - Bad Boys II (soundtrack)
06. "Keep Giving Your Love to Me" (performed by Beyoncé Knowles)

Virtue - Free
02. "Healin'"
03. "Jesus Paid The Ransom"

Latif - Love in the First
03. "It's Alright"
11. "Rain Will Go Away" 	
12. "Heavenly"
13. "I Don't Blame You"

Loon - Loon
05. "Down for Me" (featuring Mario Winans)

Britney Spears - In the Zone
14. "The Answer" (Bonus Track)
 "It Feels Nice"

2004

Carl Thomas - Let's Talk About It
03. "That's What You Are" (Interlude)

New Edition - One Love
03. "Hot 2Nite" 
16. "Feelin' It" (featuring Bun B)

Lea - Lost In Your Love (single)
00. "Lost in Your Love"

2005

Various artists - Hustle & Flow (soundtrack)
11. "Lil' Daddy" (performed by Young City & Chopper)

2006

Cory Gunz - The Apprentice Vol. 3 - Season Finale
25. "Son of a Gun"

Donell Jones - Journey of a Gemini
02. "Better Start Talking" (featuring Jermaine Dupri)
12. "If U Want" (featuring Bun B)
16. "Hands on You" (Bonus Track)

Tha Dogg Pound - Cali Iz Active
07. "Heavyweights" (featuring Snoop Dogg)

Cassie - Cassie
01. "Me & U"
02. "Long Way 2 Go" 
03. "About Time"  
04. "Kiss Me" (featuring Ryan Leslie)  
05. "Call U Out" (featuring Yung Joc) 
06. "Just One Night" (featuring Ryan Leslie)
07. "Hope You're Behaving" (Interlude) 
08. "Not With You" 
09. "Ditto"  
10. "What Do U Want"  
11. "Miss Your Touch"

Danity Kane - Danity Kane
08. "Ooh Ahh"
12. "Touching My Body"

JoJo - The High Road
06. "Like That"

2007

Cheri Dennis - In and Out of Love
02. "I Love You" (featuring Jim Jones & Yung Joc)  
18. "Ooh La La" (featuring G-Dep) (Bonus Track)

J.Y. Park - Back to Stage
01. "Kiss"

2008

Ryan Leslie - The Chemist (mixtape)
10. "Miracle" (Lex featuring Dayshia Alise)
18. "My Mistake" (Megan Rochell)  
21. "6 of 1 Thing (Remix)" (Craig David featuring Ryan Leslie)
22. "Can't Take the Music" (Uness)

Various artists - Step Up 2: The Streets (soundtrack)
05. "Is It You" (performed by Cassie)

M. Pokora - MP3
03. "Don't Give My Love Away" (featuring Ryan Leslie)
07. "Tokyo Girl"

LL Cool J - Exit 13
02. "Old School New School"
11. "Like a Radio" (featuring Ryan Leslie)

Cory Gunz - The Best Kept Secret
04. "Get Right Tonight" (featuring Ryan Leslie)

Slim - Love's Crazy
03. "Good Lovin'" (featuring Fabolous & Ryan Leslie)

2009

Ryan Leslie - Ryan Leslie
01. "Diamond Girl"     
02. "Addiction" (featuring Cassie & Fabolous)
03. "You're Fly"       
04. "Quicksand"       
05. "Valentine"      
06. "Just Right"       
07. "How It Was Supposed to Be"       
08. "I-R-I-N-A"      
09. "Out of the Blue"       
10. "Shouldn't Have to Wait"      
11. "Wanna Be Good"       
12. "Gibberish"

Jim Jones - Pray IV Reign
07. "Precious" (featuring Ryan Leslie)

Fabolous - Loso's Way
05. "Everything, Everyday, Everywhere"(featuring Keri Hilson)
10. "The Fabolous Life" (featuring Ryan Leslie)

LeToya - Lady Love
09. "Take Away Love" (featuring Estelle)

Ryan Leslie - Transition
01. "Never Gonna Break Up"  
02. "Something That I Like" (featuring Pusha T)
03. "Zodiac"        
04. "Is It Real Love?"    
05. "Sunday Night"      
06. "You're Not My Girl"       
07. "To the Top"        
08. "Nothing"    
09. "Guardian Angel"       
10. "All My Love"       
11. "I Choose You"      
12. "When We Dance" (Bonus Track) 
13. "Promise Not 2 Call" (Bonus Track)
14. "Rescue U" (Bonus Track)

Chris Brown - Graffiti
06. "Famous Girl"

Mary J. Blige - Stronger with Each Tear
03. "Said and Done"
13. "Closer" (US iTunes bonus track)

Uness
00. "Would You Love Me" (Remix) [featuring Drake]

Usher
00. "Be"

2010

Game - The Red Room
10. "Everything Red" (featuring Lil Wayne & Birdman)

Fabolous - There Is No Competition 2: The Grieving Music EP
07. "You Be Killin' Em"

Ne-Yo - Libra Scale
05. "Crazy Love" (featuring Fabolous)

Lloyd Banks - H.F.M. 2 (Hunger for More 2)
06. "So Forgetful" (featuring Ryan Leslie)

Booba - Lunatic
18. "Fast Life" (featuring Ryan Leslie)

MeLo-X - More Merch
13. "More Merch"

Krys Ivory
00. "I'll Still Be Yours"
00. "Mr. Maybe"
00. "Ooh Aah"
00. "Be Next To Ya"

2011

Fabolous - The S.O.U.L. Tape
14. "Look At Her (Killin’ Em Pt. 2)" (featuring Ne-Yo & Ryan Leslie) (Bonus Track)

Game - The R.E.D. Album
Leftover
00. "Stunt"

Jasmine V. - S(HE) BE(LIE)VE(D)
09. "Hello" (featuring Ryan Leslie)

Red Café - Shakedown
00. "Fly Together" (featuring Ryan Leslie & Rick Ross)

2012

Ryan Leslie - Les Is More
01. "Glory"   	
02. "Beautiful Lie"   
03. "Good Girl"   	
04. "5 Minute Freshen Up"   	
05. "Dress You to Undress You"   	
06. "Maybachs & Diamonds"   	
07. "Swiss Francs"   	
08. "Ups & Downs (Prelude)"   	
09. "Ups & Downs"   	
10. "Ready or Not"   	
11. "Lovers & Mountains"   	
12. "The Black Flag"   	
13. "Joan of Arc"   	
14. "Beautiful Lie" (Remix) (featuring Fabolous)

2013

Ryan Leslie - Black Mozart
01. "Carnival Of Venice" (produced with !llmind)
02. "Black Mozart" (produced with Cardiak)
03. "Higher" (produced with Cadenza)
04. "History" (produced with Cardiak)
05. "Lay Down" (produced with !llmind)
06. "Full Moon" (produced with WondaGurl)
07. "Only The Lonely" (featuring Courtney Bennett) (produced with !llmind)
08. "Evacuation" (produced with WondaGurl)
09. "Green" (featuring Fabolous) (produced with Cardiak)
10. "Bad Chicks" (produced with !llmind)
11. "I Love It" (produced with Cadenza)
12. "Coke Cans" (produced with Cardiak)

Fabolous - The S.O.U.L. Tape 3 
10. "Lay Down" (featuring Ryan Leslie) (co-produced with !llmind)

2015

Ryan Leslie - MZRT
02. "Designer Pain" (produced with Kaui Williams)
03. "Mill"ns" (produced with Danny Ives and DMR)
04. "Never Break Down" (produced with David Sylvester)
06. "No Prisoners" (produced with No Genre)
07. "Ride For Each Other" (produced with !llmind)
08. "Sounds" (featuring Bobby V) (produced with KQuick)
10. "The Wood" (produced with Kaui Williams)
12. "Wings Up"

Ne-Yo
00. "Us Like We"

Upcoming

Cory Gunz - TBA
00. "Loco" (featuring Ryan Leslie)

Alfred Abbas - This is My Life
00. "My Love"
00. "This is My Life"
00. "No Happy Ending"

References
General

Specific

External links
 
 
 

 
 
Discographies of American artists
Production discographies